Arun Singh is an Indian politician and Chartered Accountant who is the current Member of Parliament, Rajya Sabha from Uttar Pradesh from 5 December 2019. He is Bharatiya Janata Party National General Secretary and Head Quarter Incharge from 17 June 2015.

Singh, a renowned academician and successful politician is also BJP's in-charge of two states- Rajasthan and Karnataka. Earlier when he was in-charge of India's eastern state of Odisha his meticulous hard work and well planned strategies helped party to strengthen its Organisational base because of which party significantly gained at the grass root level; increasing the party's membership strength in total in Odisha which also resulted into substantial surge in BJP's support base there.

Currently he is In-Charge of the BJP Headquarters too. It is successively for the second time that party's  leadership has entrusted Shri Singh with the responsibility of National General Secretary of the world's largest political party. Prior to this he was the National Secretary and Co-Head of BJP's National Membership Programme whereafter Bhartiya Janata Party has become the world's largest party.

Arun Singh was elected as the Member of Rajya Sabha for the first time in December 2019 from the state of Uttar Pradesh. Again he is re elected for a consecutive second term in the upper house of the country on 2 November 2020. 
He has been actively involved in the parliamentary proceedings and represented the views of the government and party very assertively on various key bills and issues. Professionally being a Chartered Accountant, Singh has effectively presented the stand of the party on broad spectrum of topics in the field of economics and finance. His key interventions in the parliament includes - Discussion on the Union Budget 2020-21 and 2021–22, Insurance Amendment Bill- 2021, Working of the Ministry of Micro, Small & Medium Enterprises, Foreign Contribution and regulation Amendment Bill 2020, Insolvency & Bankruptcy Code etc. The party has benefitted from his intellectual rigour and capacity in the house through his above participations in debate and discussions.

Presently he is also member of Standing Committee on Chemical fertilizers and Standing Committee on Water Resources. He zestfully provides his constructive and innovative inputs to these platforms with an ardent believe that innovative ideas should thrive.

Early life and education 

Arun Singh was born on 4 April 1965 in the remote village of Baidha in the district of Mirzapur (U.P). His father, Mr. Vijay Narayan Singh, was a teacher and farmer. Mr. Singh inherited his hard working disposition from his parents but travelled the much difficult road of life, after he left his native place at an age of 16 and entered the wide world, overcoming the struggles through his self-determination and positive attitude.

Mr. Singh has completed his primary and secondary education from Mirzapur. He is a Commerce Graduate from Allahabad University. In 1984, after graduating from the esteemed university of the country, he headed towards the national capital, Delhi, to pursue Chartered Accountancy course. In 1988, he qualified as Chartered Accountant with a meritorious All India ranking. In his 20s he travelled across the country as an auditor. Such an experience helped him understand and appreciate the diversity of cultures that are present in our country. Since his early youth days, he developed an unswerving interest in the ideology of nationalism which led to his association with the Rashtriya Swayamsevak Sangh (RSS). He started working with the Sampark Pramukh and fulfilled all his responsibilities with earnest dedication. Subsequently, he joined the Bhartiya Janta Party's Youth wing and initiated his sincere efforts towards the expansion of the party. Since then he has become a significant and an inseparable part of the party and party's leadership.

Apart from Mr. Singh's successful and inspirational political career, he has also been a splendid academician. Not only does he credit himself with an experience of 25 years as a chartered accountant but has many other qualifications and achievements to his name. He has been a guest faculty in the discipline of management and finance, served as the Director of State Bank of India and Union Bank for seven years, worked as a consultant for  projects of World Bank and United Nations and with several notable corporations. Even until today, he has been resolute in his commitment towards excellence in academics which is evident from his devotion towards Dr. Shyama Prasad Mukherjee Research Institute, of which he is the current Secretary.

He regularly interacts with the students and professionals of management and finance in order to discuss developmental issues and models. During his interactions with the youths, he guides them not only academically but also shares his own principles and beliefs about leading a successful life. He advises the students to think of their parents and remind themselves of the schedule that they followed in the entire day before they doze off to sleep. Such an exercise of thinking of one's parents, Mr. Singh believes, will not let the youth tread the path of wrong and immorality. Also, harking back on the schedule of the day helps one contemplate on their trajectory towards their goals. Such reflections encourage performing the needful tasks to move closer and eventually achieve one's purposes of life. These interactions with the youths not underline his belief in constant learning and growing through discussions and discourse but also showcase his considerate attitude towards them wherein he strives to affect their lives in more than just an academic sense.

Political career 

Arun Singh entered the public life when he joined the Rastriya Swayamsevak Sangh (RSS) and began to prove his merit while working with the Sampark Pramukh. His political career started with his becoming the leader of the Bharatiya Janata Yuva Morcha, the youth wing of the Bharatiya Janata Party (BJP). He assumed the office of Vice President and National Treasurer of the youth wing of BJP from 1999 to 2004 and also became the National Convener of Investor Cell. During his tenure of the National Treasurer of BJYM, more than a lakh youth from across the country attended the two days Yuva Mahadhiveshan, the biggest ever, that was organised in Agra.

He played a crucial role as National Vice President BJYM in making the International Youth Convention successful, attended by the then Prime Minister Shri. Atal Bihari Vajpayee as the Chief Guest in Delhi. The Convention focussed on the significant subject of "International Youth Conference on Terrorism". It was attended by the youth of more than 40 countries.

Mr. Singh's political strategy, organizational deftness and management skills during elections remained advantageous to the party. He undertook great responsibility of managing the various processes, promoting party's propaganda and handling the media during 2003, 2008 and 2013 Chhattisgarh elections. Later he was also entrusted with the responsibility of managing Chhattisgarh in 2009 Lok Sabha elections and Jharkhand Vidhan Sabha elections.

In the meantime, he also served as the National Executive Member of BJP from 2009 to 2014. He was the State Co-Incharge (Prabhari) of Odisha BJP in the year 2013-14 and was later promoted to the post of State Incharge taking into account his diligence and efficiency. He has also been a member of the Team of Modi Campaign Committee, New Delhi, India. He served as the National Secretary of BJP from 16 August 2014 till 16 June 2015. He exhibited his hard work and ingenious skills as the National Co-Incharge for the membership drive wherein he not only directed the drive but himself travelled throughout the country to make the campaign successful under the leadership of Shri Amit Shah. The successful campaign, to which his mature and competent leadership and his proficient work were significant, led to his promotion to the post of National General Secretary of BJP on 17 June 2015.

Mr. Singh, at present, is the Member of Parliament (Rajya Sabha) Uttar Pradesh, National General Secretary, In-Charge of the BJP Headquarters and member of the Office Modernisation Committee. He also leads the party's National Member Programme which has made BJP world's largest party. It categorically underlines his vital role in the expansion and escalating growth of the party.

Arun Singh in his public and political life is believed to be an accessible and an amiable leader. His constant interactions with the youth representatives, professionals hailing from varied fields and students across the nation have not only stirred a new wave of leadership but have also foregrounded the importance of the exchange of ideas. He is very receptive of advises, feedback and suggestions that reach him through various sources.

He comes across as a leader with conviction and farsightedness. In his public speeches as well as his other discourses he has been regularly stressing the importance of development. He is deeply critical of the propagators of crime and corruption in the country that remain major obstacles in the path of nation's development and has been quite vocal about in all his media interactions. In the year 2019 he elected MP of Rajya Sabha from Uttar Pradesh;he took Oath of affirmation in Rajya Sabha on 09/12/2019.

Ideology 

He believes in the doctrine of Integral Humanism "Ektama Manavvaad" propounded by Pandit Deendayal Upadhyaya in 1964. The doctrine proposes that India should develop following an indigenous economic model that situates the human being at the centre stage. Mr. Singh, completely in line with the doctrine, maintains that economic development meets its purpose only when the entire society is partake of that development. He is completely in faith with the ideology of BJP and the work ethics and approach of the current Prime Minister Mr. Narendra Modi. He believes and shares the party's commitment towards the development of the nation made during the general election. Lauding the Prime Minister's leadership skills and approach towards the overall growth of the nation, Arun Singh himself has proved his able leadership qualities time and again.

Mr. Singh, a leader of the modern times, is receptive and responsive with regards to suggestions and feedbacks. He is an ardent proponent of the power of innovation, technology and collaboration that brings inclusive development to the society.

Personal life and interests  
Arun Singh is a successful academician and politician. His wife is a Post Graduate in Zoology and they are blessed with two daughters and a son.

References 

1965 births
Living people
Bharatiya Janata Party politicians from Uttar Pradesh
Uttar Pradesh politicians
People from Mirzapur